Ronald Edwin Muzzall (born 1963) is an American farmer and politician from Washington.

He has served as a Republican member of the Washington State Senate for Washington's tenth legislative district since October 18, 2019,  He was appointed unanimously, when he was appointed to replace Barbara Bailey, by the Skagit County Commissioners, Island County Commissioners, and Snohomish County Council.

References

External links 
 Ron Muzzall at ballotpedia.org
 Ron Muzzall at votesmart.org

Year of birth missing (living people)
Living people
21st-century American politicians
Farmers from Washington (state)
1960s births
Republican Party Washington (state) state senators